Qareh Bughaz (also Romanized as Qareh Būghāz; also known as Qarah Būghār) is a village in Ajorluy-ye Gharbi Rural District, Baruq District, Miandoab County, West Azerbaijan Province, Iran. At the 2006 census, its population was 29, in 5 families.

References 

Populated places in Miandoab County